Wellington District may refer to:
 Wellington District, Upper Canada
 Wellington Rural District (disambiguation)
 Wellington Rural District (Shropshire)
 Wellington Rural District (Somerset)
 Wellington Land District (disambiguation)
 Wellington Land District, Western Australia
 Wellington Land District, Tasmania

District name disambiguation pages